The FRAG-12 is a specialized shotgun shell which contains a small amount of high explosive to breach intermediate barriers, defeat light vehicles, and disrupt IEDs. The shell was designed by the Special Cartridge Company in London, England. Later its patent extended to Olympic Technologies Ltd in Gibraltar.

Four folding fins spring out after leaving the muzzle.
 
A company called Combined Systems, Inc. sells FRAG-12 under the name FRAG12HE. The rounds have low popularity due to relative high cost to performance ratio, limited application, and being limited to military only purchase. Sales seem to be limited because of the wide array of other available rounds for military users in more suitable calibers such as 20×30B K-11; 20×42B PAW 20; 25×40B XM25; 25×59B LW25; 30×29B VOG-17; 35mm CL DFS10; VOG-17, 35×32SR DF87, 40mm CL VOG-25M, 40×46SR LV, 40×53SR HV, 40mm CL Balkan, and calibers used by the M203 grenade launcher or Milkor MGL, GP-25, and similar dedicated devices. The round was widely advertised with the Atchisson AA-12 assault shotgun.

References

Explosive projectiles
Military cartridges
Shotgun shells